Like Someone in Love ( Raiku samuwan in rabu) is a French-Japanese drama film written and directed by Iranian director Abbas Kiarostami, starring Rin Takanashi, Tadashi Okuno and Ryō Kase. It was his final film to be released in his lifetime. The France-Japan co-production competed for the Palme d'Or at the 2012 Cannes Film Festival.

Plot
In Tokyo, sociology student Akiko (Rin Takanashi) moonlights as a high-end prostitute. Her jealous boyfriend, Noriaki (Ryō Kase) is suspicious, but does not know about her work.

One night, she is assigned to Takashi (Tadashi Okuno), an elderly former university professor who is more interested in making her dinner than having sex. The morning after their unconsummated night, Takashi drives Akiko to school for her exams. While waiting in the car for her, he encounters Noriaki, who assumes Takashi is her grandfather and asks permission to marry her. Takashi does not correct Noriaki's assumption and assures him he is not ready for marriage.

After Akiko's test, the three drive toward a bookstore. Noriaki diagnoses a problem with the car, and convinces Takashi to drive it to the garage he owns, where he replaces a fan belt. There they encounter one of Takashi's former students; Akiko worries he will reveal the truth to Noriaki.

Takashi drops Akiko at the bookstore and returns home. Soon afterwards, he receives a panicked phone call from Akiko and returns to the bookstore to pick her up. Her mouth is bloodied, but she does not say why. Takashi takes Akiko to his apartment. Noriaki arrives, threatening them over the intercom and banging on the door. Takashi peers out his window to see what Noriaki is doing. An object is thrown through the window and Takashi falls to the floor.

Cast
Rin Takanashi as Akiko
Tadashi Okuno as Takashi
Ryo Kase as Noriaki
Denden as Hiroshi
Reiko Mori as Nagisa
Koichi Ohori as Taxi driver
Tomoaki Tatsumi as Mechanic
Hiroyuki Kishi as Takashi's former student
Seina Kasugai as Nagisa's friend
Mihiko Suzuki as Neighbor
Kaneko Kubota as Akiko's grandmother

Production
Production credits

Associate producer: Nathanaël Karmitz
Associate producer: Charles Gillibert
Production designer: Toshihiro Isomi
Costume designer: Masae Miyamoto
Sound designer: Mohammad Reza Delpak
Sound editor: Reza Narimizadeh

Like Someone in Love is a film production by France's MK2 Group and Japan's Eurospace. It had a budget of US$4.8 million. Filming was originally planned for April 2011, but had to be rescheduled due to the 2011 Tōhoku earthquake and tsunami. The film was eventually shot over eight weeks in October 2011. It was shot on location in Tokyo and Yokohama.

The film's initial production title was The End. It was Kiarostami's second feature film shot entirely outside his native Iran, following Certified Copy (2010) which was shot in Italy in 2009.

Reception

Critical reception
The film received mostly positive reviews by critics. It holds an 83% approval rating on Rotten Tomatoes based on 102 reviews, with an average rating of 7.2 out of 10. The website's critical consensus reads, "In his second film outside his native Iran, director Abbas Kiarostami maintains the mysterious, reflective mood of previous triumphs." At Metacritic, which assigns a weighted average score out of 100 to reviews from mainstream critics, the film received an average score of 76 based on 31 reviews, indicating "generally favorable reviews".

David Denby of The New Yorker writes, "This story, driven by undercurrents and oblique hints, is almost surprising in its circumspection." He adds, "The cinematography is clear and hard-focussed, and the editing produces long, flowing passages. This exquisitely made, elusive film has a lulling rhythm and a melancholy charm."

Accolades

References

External links

Like Someone in Love: On Likeness an essay by Nico Baumbach at the Criterion Collection

2012 films
Films about domestic violence
Films about prostitution in Japan
Films directed by Abbas Kiarostami
Films shot in Japan
Films shot in Tokyo
French drama films
Japanese drama films
2010s Japanese-language films
Japan in non-Japanese culture
2010s French films